Mroualé is a village in the commune of Tsingoni on the island of Mayotte in the Indian Ocean.

Populated places in Mayotte